Amrishbhai Rasiklal Patel (born 14 September 1952) is an Indian politician belonging to Bharatiya Janata Party (BJP). He started his political career in the Shirpur as an independent politician, and was the President of Shirpur Municipal Corporation, a four-time (1990 to 2009) legislator from Shirpur (Vidhan Sabha constituency) as an Indian National Congress candidate, who has never lost an assembly election, and was also a state government cabinet minister. He joined Bharatiya Janata Party in 2019.

Amrish Patel is Chancellor of SVKM's NMIMS and President of Shri Vile Parle Kelavani Mandal, a Mumbai-based Educational Trust, which runs several institutions including Mithibai College, Narsee Monjee College of Commerce and Economics, SVKM's NMIMS and Dwarkadas J. Sanghvi College of Engineering. He is also the founder of Shirpur Education Society.

Personal life
Amrish Patel was born on 2 November 1952 to Rasiklal Patel in Ujjain. He completed his schooling in Ujjain and Ahmedabad, and later moved to Shirpur with his father. Patel is married to Jayshreeben Patel with whom he has a son and a daughter.

Political career 
Patel entered politics as an independent candidate in Shirpur-Warwade municipal council elections and contested and won as President (1985) and held the position for 12 years. Later, he joined Indian National Congress and contested and won Assembly elections from Shirpur (Vidhan Sabha constituency) in 1990, 1995, 1999 and 2004. He had also served as Cabinet Minister for School Education, Culture, Sports & Youth Affairs (Govt. of Maharashtra) in the year 2003-04 and also served as Guardian Minister Of Dhule District. He was declared unopposed elected Member of Maharashtra Legislative Council as an Indian National Congress nominee, representing Dhule & Nandurbar Dist. in 2009 and as a Bharatiya Janata Party candidate in 2021.

Social work

Shirpur Pattern

Amrish Patel is also known for his contribution to Shirpur for the implemented irrigation project, started in October 2004, popularly known as the "Shirpur pattern". The project manager for the Shirpur pattern was Suresh Khanapurkar.

Priyadarshini Spinning Mill

Amrishbhai is Founder Chairman of Priyadarshini Spinning Mill, Shirpur which has provided employment to over 5000 people of Shirpur and has successfully created a notable position on the national map of textile industries.

Shirpur Education Society

Amrish Patel was instrumental in establishing Shirpur Education Society which owns 69 institutes of primary, secondary and higher education, imparting education to more than 40,000 students from K.G. (Kindergarten) to P.G. (Postgraduate) level.

Dhule District Co‐operative Bank

Patel had been the Chairman of Dhule District Central Co‐operative Bank for many years. (Tenure = 1998 to 1999)

References

External links 
 
 
 

Bharatiya Janata Party politicians from Maharashtra
1952 births
Living people
People from Ujjain